The Japanese warship  was a ship of governmental forces during the Boshin war.

She was originally built in England and acquired by the fief of Chōshū in western Japan, before being remitted to the new Imperial government in 1868.

She rated 125 tons, had a 60 hp engine and was armed with 5 cannons.

Notes

Bibliography

Teibo
Ships built in England